Wassyla Tamzali (born 1941) is an Algerian writer, lawyer, and feminist.

Biography
The daughter of an Algerian father of Turkish origin, and a Spanish mother, she was born in Béjaïa. She was raised by her Spanish mother after the murder of her father. From 1966 to 1977, she was a lawyer in the Algerian court system. 
In 1979, she joined UNESCO, responsible for the program dealing with violations of women's rights. In 1989, she became part of the leadership of the Socialist Forces Front. She was a founding member of the Collectif Maghreb Égalité in 1992. In 1996, she became director of the program for promoting the status of women in the Mediterranean area. 
In 2001, she became vice-president of the Forum international des Femmes de la Méditerranée. 
In 2006, she became executive director for the Collectif Maghreb Égalité.

Tamzali self-identifies as a "woman, bourgeois, Francophone, feminist and freethinker, if not atheist."

In 2018 Tamazali won the Mediterranean Award for Culture.

Selected works 
 En attendant Omar Gatlato (1979)
 Abzim, with Claude Ber (1984)
 Une éducation algérienne. De la révolution à la revanche des tribu (2007)
 Une femme en colère (2009)
 Burqa? (2010)

References 

1941 births
Living people
People from Béjaïa
Algerian writers
Algerian feminists
Algerian atheists
Algerian women writers
Algerian people of Turkish descent
Algerian people of Spanish descent
21st-century Algerian people